Alexander Mikhailovich Opekushin (Russian: Александр Михайлович Опекушин; 16 November 1838, Svechkino, Danilovsky Uyezd - 4 March 1923, Rybnitsa, Danilovsky Uyezd) was a Russian sculptor, known primarily for his monumental works.

Biography 

He was born on the estates of E. V. Olkhin, a major landowner. His father, a serf who made regular visits to Saint Petersburg, obtained permission from Olkhin for Alexander to attend drawing classes at the Imperial Society for the Encouragement of the Arts. He was able to graduate in two years, instead of the usual three, and was taken into the studios of the sculptor, David Jensen. In order to complete his studies at the Imperial Academy of Arts, he had to purchase his freedom for 500 Rubles. He was legally freed in 1859. Two years later, he married Evdokia Ivanovna Guskina, the daughter of a state serf.

At the Academy, he continued his studies with Jensen. In 1862, he received his first award: a small silver medal for a bas-relief on a Biblical theme. His talent was noticed by the artist, Mikhail Mikeshin, who invited him to participate in completing his monument, the "Millennium of Russia". The Academy awarded him the title of "Artist First-Class" in 1870, and he was promoted to "Academician" in 1872.

In 1888, he entered a competition to design a monument honoring the former Governor-General of Siberia, Nikolay Muravyov-Amursky, and his entry was selected. When it was cast in bronze and erected in Khabarovsk in 1891, it was the tallest monument in Russia (16 meters/52.5 feet, including the pedestal). The statue was removed by the revolutionary government in 1925 and replaced by one of Lenin. Another monument, to the industrialist, in Sumy (1895), was destroyed during the same period. Between 1873 and 1913, he created several monuments to Alexander Pushkin, which still survive, as do ones to Tsar Alexander II in Częstochowa and Rybinsk.

Despite his large public works, and commissions from the Romanovs (he was a staunch monarchist), it was difficult for him to support his large family, so he also did decorative work.

In 1919, sick and impoverished, he and his youngest daughters were sent to live with a cousin in Yaroslavl Oblast, at state expense. Once there, a local priest in Rybnitsa provided him with a free house. The promised government pension was not paid until 1922, so his neighbors provided the necessary support. In early 1923, he caught a cold, which turned into pneumonia, and he died. He was buried in a local cemetery, not far from where he was baptized. It was only in 1972 that a modest tombstone was erected. In 1986, the newly discovered Asteroid 5055  was named after him.

References

Further reading 
 
 A. Skrebkov, "Академик А. М. Опекушин: К 90-летию со дня рождения", In: Красная панорама, 1928, № 52, pg.15
 Беляев Н., Шмидт Н. А. М. Опекушин. — М.: Искусство, 1954.
 I. M. Suslov, "А. М. Опекушин. Жизнь и творчество" (life and Work) Online @ LiveInternet

External links 

 Detailed biography from the Great Encyclopedia of the Russian People @ the Institute of Russian Civilization
 Yuri Klimakov, Его знала вся образованная Россия (All Educated Russia Knew Him) @ Русская линия
 Evgeny Bolotin, "Какой-то крестьянин Опекушин…" (Some Peasant Opekushin...) In: Наш современник, #6, June 2004

19th-century sculptors from the Russian Empire
20th-century Russian sculptors
20th-century Russian male artists
Russian male sculptors
1838 births
1923 deaths
Russian monarchists
19th-century male artists from the Russian Empire
People from Danilovsky Uyezd